Synodical College in Fulton, Missouri provided education for young women from 1873 to 1928. The school operated under the auspices of the Presbyterian Church. The college opened in 1873.

This was a successor institution to the Fulton Female Academy, opened by Rev. William W. Robertson in 1842 as one of the earliest American women's colleges. It became affiliated with the Presbyterian Church from 1871.

Trustees
The first board of trustees included:  William King, Edwin Curd, W.W. Robertson, C.C. Hersman, John F. Cowan, W.W. Trimble, T.B. Nisbet, Samuel T. Shaw, and Samuel I. McKamey.

The trustees during the final 1927–28 academic year included: C.F. Richmond, John E. Kerr, T.P. Harrison, C.R. Nisbet, S.G. Wood, T.R.R. Ely, C.A. McPheeters, J.W. Gallaher, J.W. McKamey, E.J. Grant, J.G. McConkey, I Cochran Hunt, R.S. Boyd, and Joseph Rennie.

Presidents
T.O. Rogers, 1873–1874; W.W. Hill, 1874–1877; B.H. Charles, 1877–1888; H.C. Evans, 1888–1893; John W. Primrose, 1893–1896; Thomas Peyton Walton (previously president of Elizabeth Aull Seminary at Lexington, Missouri) followed; John James, 1914-1924; and Colin A. McPheeters served as Acting President during the final 1927–28 academic year.

Academic program
Synodical College was recognized by the University of Missouri as a standard junior college after 1916.  In 1925 the Synod of Missouri approved a resolution, at a meeting in St. Joseph, Missouri, to enhance the curriculum with the goal of providing a four-year collegiate program.  The initial steps toward the goal included an affiliation agreement with Westminster College to share some faculty and courses. Synodical College closed in 1928.

Alumnae 

 Hallie Paxson Winsborough (1865–1940), American church worker

Bibliography
 Conrad, ed. Encyclopedia of the History of Missouri, vol. VI. 1901. pp. 147–8.  
 Parrish, William E. Westminster College: An Informal History, 1851-1999. 2000.  pp. 51, 165.  
 Synodical College Catalog, 1927-28, vol. XIII.  June, 1927.
 Williams, Walter.  The State of Missouri.  1901. p. 342.

See also
 List of current and historical women's universities and colleges
 Timeline of women's colleges in the United States

External links
Links to Selected .pdf's of yearbooks and commencement programs
List of Missouri Colleges that have Closed, Merged, or Changed Names

Defunct private universities and colleges in Missouri
Female seminaries in the United States
Schools in Callaway County, Missouri
History of women in Missouri